Vatneleiren is a military base located in the municipality of Sandnes in Rogaland county, Norway. It was constructed just east of the Hanafjellet mountain just outside the city of Sandnes by the German Army during World War II, and has been used by the Norwegian Army since 1945. After the Cold War ended the number of soldiers stationed there gradually decreased, and the base is now mainly used by the Norwegian Home Guard.  The Agder og Rogaland Heimevernsdistrikt 08 (Agder and Rogaland Home District 08) is based here, covering the two southernmost counties of Rogaland and Agder. The United Nations  Logistics Officers Centre maintains a training centre in Vatneleiren, offering a logistics course.

References

Norwegian Army bases
Sandnes
Military installations in Rogaland